Micromyrtus minutiflora is a spreading shrub in the myrtle family, only found on alluvial soils in open forest in the western districts of Sydney. Flowering occurs in the warmer months. A rare plant, listed in New South Wales as endangered by extinction. Threats to its existence include urban expansion, habitat loss, weed invasion, human recreation and the dumping of rubbish.

References

minutiflora
Flora of New South Wales
Myrtales of Australia
Vulnerable flora of Australia
Taxa named by George Bentham